Rosy is a given name or nickname and, more rarely, a surname. It may refer to:


People

Given name
 Rosy Afsari (1946?–2007), actress in the Bangladeshi film industry
 Rosy Akbar, Fijian politician who assumed office in 2014
 Rosy Armen (born 1923), French singer of Armenian descent
 Rosy Lamb (born 1973), expatriate American sculptor and painter
 Rosy Parlane, male electronic musician from New Zealand
 Rosy Pereira (born 1951), Indonesian-Dutch pop singer, half of the duo Rosy & Andres

Nickname or stage name
 Rosy Bindi (born 1951), Italian politician and current President of the Antimafia Commission
 Rosy Buchanan (born 1961), Australian politician
 James “Rosy” McHargue (1902–1999), American jazz clarinetist
 Rosy Ocampo (born 1959), Mexican television producer and director
 James Roosevelt Roosevelt (1854–1927), AKA "Rosy" Roosevelt, American diplomat and half-brother of Franklin Delano Roosevelt
 Rudy Rosatti or “Rosy” Rosatti (1895–1975), American National Football League player
Aaron "Rosy" Rosenberg (1912–1979), two-time "All-American" college football player, and film and television producer 
 Wilfred “Rosy” Ryan (1898–1980), American Major League Baseball pitcher
 Bernadine Rose “Rosy” Senanayake (born 1958), Sri Lankan politician, activist and beauty queen
 Rosy Varte (1923–2012), French actress born Nevarte Manouelian
 Rosalie “Rosy” Wertheim (1888–1949), Dutch pianist, music educator and composer

Surname
 Maurice Rosy (1927–2013), Belgian comics writer and artistic director of Spirou
 P K Rosy (1903–1988), Indian Malayalam actress

Fictional characters

Given Name
 Rosy Ryan, the title character of the 1970 film Ryan's Daughter, played by Sarah Miles
 a character in the 1995 film Balto

Surname
 Amy Rose, a fictional character in Sonic the Hedgehog video games originally nicknamed Rosy the Rascal

See also
 Rosie (given name)

Lists of people by nickname